Left Bank Encores is a live album by saxophonists Sonny Stitt and Gene Ammons recorded in Baltimore in 1973 and released on the Prestige label in 2002. The album was recorded at the same concert that produced God Bless Jug and Sonny.

Reception
The Allmusic review stated "when the saxmen were reunited at that Baltimore concert in 1973, they weren't as competitive and battle-minded as they had been in their younger days. But their chops were still in top shape, and they could still swing unapologetically hard... Like God Bless Jug and Sonny, Left Bank Encores falls short of essential, but is an enjoyable disc that Ammons and Stitt's hardcore fans will appreciate".

Track listing 
 Just in Time" (Betty Comden, Adolph Green, Jule Styne) - 9:08    
 "They Can't Take That Away from Me" (George Gershwin, Ira Gershwin) - 11:31    
 "Theme from Love Story" (Francis Lai, Carl Sigman) - 9:39    
 "Exactly Like You" (Dorothy Fields, Jimmy McHugh) - 6:56    
 "Don't Go to Strangers" (Redd Evans, Arthur Kent, Dave Mann) - 6:04    
 "Autumn Leaves" (Joseph Kosma, Johnny Mercer, Jacques Prévert) - 15:52    
 "Blues Up and Down" (Gene Ammons, Sonny Stitt) - 14:05

Personnel 
Gene Ammons - tenor saxophone (tracks 1, 2 & 4-7)
Sonny Stitt - tenor saxophone (tracks 1 & 4-7), alto saxophone (track 2) 
Cedar Walton - piano - trio track 3
Sam Jones - bass
Billy Higgins - drums
Etta Jones - vocals (tracks 4 & 5)

References 

2002 live albums
Prestige Records live albums
Gene Ammons live albums
Sonny Stitt live albums
Collaborative albums